The 55th Pennsylvania House of Representatives District is located in southwest Pennsylvania and has been represented by Jill N. Cooper since 2023.

District profile
The 55th District is located in Westmoreland County and includes the following areas:

Arnold
Avonmore
 Bell Township
Delmont
 Derry Township (part)
District Alters 
District Simpsons
Export
Lower Burrell (part)
Ward 04 (part)
Division 01
 Loyalhanna Township
Murrysville
 New Alexandria
New Kensington
Oklahoma
Salem Township
Upper Burrell Township
 Washington Township

Representatives

References

Government of Armstrong County, Pennsylvania
Government of Indiana County, Pennsylvania
Government of Westmoreland County, Pennsylvania
55